The 1970 All-Ireland Senior Camogie Championship was the high point of the 1970 season. The championship was won by Cork, who defeated Killkenny by an 11-point margin in the final. The match drew an attendance of 4,000.

Semi-finals
Kilkenny won the Leinster Championship for the first time when they defeated Dublin 5–3 to 4–3 and received an unexpected bye to the All-Ireland final when  Galway withdrew, receiving a three-month suspension from Central Council for failing to fulfil the fixture. Cork owe their victory over Antrim to a tremendous opening quarter when they raced into an eleven-point lead with two goals from Pat Moloney and a third from Rosie Hennessy.

Final
Liz Garvan, the 17-year-old tennis champion from Old Als, stole the show in the All-Ireland final with 3-6 of Cork’s total. Agnes Hourigan wrote in the Irish Press
This was a match from which Cork emerged the most clear-cut of winners. They had an early shock when Anne Carroll cracked home Maura Cassin’s pass in the fourth minute but the advantage was short lived. Cork were in full command. True, Kilkenny had plenty of chances through the last ten minutes but their forwards were over-anxious and fumbled them away.

Final stages

MATCH RULES
50 minutes
Replay if scores level
Maximum of 3 substitutions

See also
 All-Ireland Senior Hurling Championship
 Wikipedia List of Camogie players
 National Camogie League
 Camogie All Stars Awards
 Ashbourne Cup

References

External links
 Camogie Association
 Historical reports of All Ireland finals
 Historical reports of All Ireland finals * All-Ireland Senior Camogie Championship: Roll of Honour
 Camogie on facebook
 Camogie on GAA Oral History Project

All-Ireland Senior Camogie Championship
1970
All-Ireland Senior Camogie Championship
All-Ireland Senior Camogie Championship